WRZO-LP (102.9 FM, "102.9 the Razor") is a radio station broadcasting an album-oriented rock music format. Licensed to Chambersburg, Pennsylvania, United States, the station is currently owned by Dack Inc.

References

External links
 102.9 The Razor Online
 

RZO-LP
RZO-LP
Album-oriented rock radio stations in the United States
Chambersburg, Pennsylvania
Radio stations established in 2004
2004 establishments in Pennsylvania